Cute Is What We Aim For is an American rock band from Buffalo, New York. The band formed in 2005 and has since released two albums: The Same Old Blood Rush with a New Touch and Rotation. The band was previously signed with record label Fueled by Ramen for their two releases.

History

Early years and signing with Fueled by Ramen (2001–05)
The original members of Cute Is What We Aim For were childhood friends. When the band was formed in January 2005, the members were still in their teenage years. Since the band's inception, it has been subject to several line-up changes. Shortly after forming in January 2005, Cute Is What We Aim For began releasing demos through Myspace and PureVolume, which helped the band gain initial exposure. Guitarist Jeff Czum said their success was brought about by Hawthorne Heights' street team: "Literally overnight we got like 10,000 fans on Myspace and started to get attention from labels." In the following months, the group continued to record and play shows, increasing their fan base and declining advances from record labels. On November 29, it was announced that the band had signed to Fueled by Ramen after their founder John Janick listened to their New York City recording sessions in July.

The Same Old Blood Rush with a New Touch (2006–08)
In April 2006, former bassist Donnie Arthur joined the New Tragic, alongside members of From First to Last and Maylene and the Sons of Disaster. He later formed Talking in My Sleep. On June 20, 2006, Cute Is What We Aim For's debut album, The Same Old Blood Rush with a New Touch hit store shelves, debuting at number 75 on the Billboard 200.

During the fall of 2006, Cimato parted ways with the band. Jack Marin (formerly of October Fall) filled the role of touring bassist until departing in April 2007 due to "some personal issues with another member," leading to Cimato's return. In October 2007, Cimato was asked in an interview if he viewed his role in the band as permanent. He replied, "Definitely permanent. I had 6 months at home to finish up high school and after that I was like, 'Wow, I miss playing music.' I was blessed enough to get that opportunity again." However, Cimato left the band once again in March 2008. It was announced that Dave Melillo would play bass until further notice.

Rotation and line-up changes (2008–12)

In 2008, Cute Is What We Aim For entered the studio to record with producer John Feldmann. Rotation debuted at #21 on the U.S. Billboard 200 albums chart selling around 22,000 copies.

In 2010, it was announced that the band Cute Is What We Aim For lost all of its members except for frontman Shaant Hacikyan, who stated that he planned to continue releasing music under the band's name. Dave Melillo and Jeff Czum went on to form Nocturnal Me. The band appeared on the Punk Goes Pop 3 compilation, released on November 2, 2010, covering the song "Dead and Gone" by T.I. and Justin Timberlake. Their new band released two EPs before signing to Apparition Records in 2011.

On April 29, 2010, Hacikyan released a new single called "Harbor" which was made available to download online.

Comeback (2012–present)
On August 18, 2012, the band played an hour-long acoustic set with original members Shaant Hacikyan, Fred Cimato, and Jeff Czum. This was the first set the full band had performed in 6 years. During the set, the band announced that it was officially making a comeback. Cute Is What We Aim For played a comeback show with The Daydream Chronicles and Fictitious Ray on September 21, 2012 at Mohawk Place in Buffalo, New York. On January 20, 2013, Shaant Hacikyan announced at a show in Memphis, Tennessee, that the band would be releasing new material Spring/Summer 2013, with demos to come earlier than that. It is currently unclear if the release will be an EP or an LP. On 27 February 2013, Cute Is What We Aim For premiered a new demo called "Titanic". 20 days later on 27 March they posted a YouTube link to a lyric video of their new song named "Next to Me". On September 2, the band released another new song titled "A Closed Mind With an Open Mouth". The song was made available for purchase on the iTunes store the next day. A headlining tour was also announced to coincide with the newly released song. The band supported You Me at Six on their US tour in September and October.

On January 18, 2014 the band shared some songs such as "I Was Worth Using" on SoundCloud. The band performed on the Vans Warped Tour in 2014, after which they broke up for a second time. In January 2016, Hacikyan reconnected with the rest of the band members. The group started discussing the possibility of a 10-year tour for The Same Old Blood Rush with a New Touch. In March, the band announced the anniversary tour, via their official Instagram page. On November 23, 2016, the band was announced to perform at the Slam Dunk Festival in the UK, where they would continue their 10-year anniversary tour.

Band members
Current lineup
 Shaant Hacikyan – lead vocals (2005–present)
 Jeff Czum – guitar, backing vocals (2005–09; 2012–present)
 Tom Falcone – drums (2005–08; 2012–present)
 Seth Van Dusen – bass(2014–present)
 Dylan Sellick – guitar (2010–present)

Former members

 Rob Neiss – drums (2005)
 Donnie Arthur – bass (2005)
 Fred Cimato – bass (2005–06; 2007–08; 2012–13)
 Jack Marin – bass (2006–07)
 Dave Melillo – rhythm guitar (2007–08); bass (2008–09)
 Liam Killeen – drums (2008)
 Mike Lasaponara – drums (2008–09)
 Clark Spurlock – lead guitar (2008–09)
 Zach Pagano – rhythm guitar (2008–09)
 Michael Novak – drums (2009–10)
 Michael Brady – lead guitar, backing vocals (2009–10)
 Dylan Sellick- rhythm guitar (2009–10)
 Kevin Scoma – rhythm guitar (2009–10)
 Lewis Storey – rhythm triangle (2006–07)
 Pat Maclean – bass (2009–10)
 Tyler Long – bass (2013)
 Joseph White – bass (2013–14)

Timeline

Discography

Studio albums

Singles

 I  Peaked at number 191 on the UK Singles Chart.

Music videos 
 "There's a Class for This" (2006, directed by Jay Martin)
 "The Curse of Curves" (2007, directed by Lex Halaby)
 "Newport Living" (2007, live version)
 "Practice Makes Perfect" (2008, directed by Walter Robot)
 "Doctor" (2009)
 "Next to Me" (2013, lyric video)

References

External links
 

American power pop groups
Fueled by Ramen artists
Musical groups established in 2005
Musical groups disestablished in 2009
Musical groups reestablished in 2012
Musical groups from Buffalo, New York
American emo musical groups